Roland Lvovich Dobrushin (July 20, 1929 – November 12, 1995) was a mathematician who made important contributions to probability theory,  mathematical physics, and information theory.

Life and work

Dobrushin received his Ph.D. at Moscow State University under the supervision of Andrey Kolmogorov.

In statistical mechanics, he introduced (simultaneously with Lanford and Ruelle) the DLR equations for the Gibbs measure. Together with Kotecký and Shlosman, he studied the formation of droplets in Ising-type models, providing mathematical justification of the Wulff construction.

He was a foreign member of the American Academy of Arts and Sciences, Academia Europæa and US National Academy of Sciences.

The Dobrushin prize was established in his honour.

Notes

References

External links
 
 Memorial website.
 Biography (in Russian)
 Obituary from The Independent

1929 births
1995 deaths
Soviet mathematicians
20th-century Russian mathematicians
Probability theorists
Moscow State University alumni
Members of Academia Europaea
Foreign associates of the National Academy of Sciences